Felice D'Amico (born 22 August 2000) is an Italian footballer who plays as a forward for  club Pro Sesto on loan from Sampdoria.

Club career
He played for the Under-19 squads of Palermo, Inter, Chievo and Sampdoria. With Inter, he played in the 2018–19 UEFA Youth League.

He made his Serie A debut for Sampdoria on 5 July 2020 in a game against SPAL. He substituted Karol Linetty in the 89th minute.

On 1 October 2020, he returned to Chievo on a season-long loan. On 29 January 2021, he was recalled from Chievo loan after making just two substitute appearances for the club and was loaned to Serie C club Pro Sesto. On 19 July 2021, he joined Gubbio on loan.

On 10 July 2022, D'Amico returned to Pro Sesto on a new loan.

International career
He was first called up to represent his country in 2015 for the Under-16 friendlies. He also played for Italy on the Under-17 and Under-18 levels, all in friendlies.

References

External links
 

2000 births
Living people
Footballers from Palermo
Italian footballers
Association football forwards
Serie A players
Serie B players
Serie C players
Inter Milan players
U.C. Sampdoria players
A.C. ChievoVerona players
S.S.D. Pro Sesto players
A.S. Gubbio 1910 players
Italy youth international footballers